Mallur is a village or town council (panchayat) in the Salem district, which is located in the Indian state of Tamil Nadu.

Etymology 
The village name Mallur is believed to be derived from the Malli(Jasmine) flower, which is heavily cultivated in the area.

Geography 
It is located near several mountain ranges in India.

The main economy are the numerous brick factories around Mallur. The Thursday Market is very popular for buying and selling fresh, locally grown produce. Mallur is quite famous for a local dish of spiced puffed rice and also a grocery shops

Demographics 
Mallur is in the district of Salem, a part of Tamil Nadu in India. Mallur is divided into 15 wards for which elections are held every 5 years. In 2011, Mallur had a population of 10,331 of which 5,112 were males and 5,219 were females.  Scheduled Castes and Scheduled Tribes make up 26.01% and 0.04% of the total population, respectively. Children up to 6 years of age make up 9.26% of the total population.

The literacy rate of Mallur is 75.65%, lower than the state average of 80.09%. In Mallur, male literacy is around 84.26% while the female literacy rate is 67.21%. Mallur has over 2,754 houses to which it supplies basic amenities like water and sewerage. It is also authorized to build roads within the town.

Out of the Mallur total population, 4,749 are workers: 3,143 males and 1,606 females. In this census survey, a worker is defined as person who is in business, has a job, is in service, cultivates the land or is in some other labour activity. Of this total working population, 92.42% are engaged in full-time work, while 7.58%  are part-time workers.

The Government sanctioned the laying of a four-lane road which has reduced traffic throughout the village. NH7, which is the longest National highway in India, bisects the village. TNSTC buses travel between Salem, Rasipuram, Namakkal, and the southern region of Tamil Nadu via Mallur via NH7.

Education

College:
The Kongu Polytechnic College.

School:
The Government Higher Secondary School, Government Primary Union School, Vee Gee Vikass Public school, Vetri Vikass Higher Secondary School, Merlion Matric School, Jothi Vidhyalaya School.

Hospitals
There are two hospitals: Government Hospital Mallur, and a private Multi Speciality Hospital.

Transport

Road
Mallur is located in NH 7. There are many government and private buses run from Salem to Rasipuram, Namakkal, Karur, Trichy, Madurai and Southern districts of Tamil Nadu to Kanyakumari then southern part of Kerala via Mallur. Mallur is sub-urban area of Salem city.

Rail

Mallur Railway Station is on the Salem to Karur Track. The railway code is MALR and the track is a single diesel BG. The station has three platforms and four trains: 56105/Salem Karur Passenger, 56107/Salem Karur Passenger, 56106/Karur Salem Passenger, and 56108/Karur Salem Passenger.

References 

Cities and towns in Salem district